Shi Daniang, known as the Great Lady of Gresik or Nyai Gede Pinatih, was a Chinese-Muslim noblewoman from Palembang during the Majapahit era. She was the daughter of chieftain xuanweishi Shi Jinqing of Palembang. After her father died, admiral Admiral Zheng He of Ming China decided to make her brother the new chieftain of Palembang, so she left Palembang and went to Gresik in east Java to preach her religion to the natives.

Early life 
Born Shishi Daniangzi (施氏大娘子), she was the eldest daughter of a non-Muslim Chinese business elite, Shi Jinqing, in Palembang.

Upon her father's death around 1421, a family feud broke out over the control of the family business between her, her brother and sister. Eventually, Shi Er-Jie, her younger sister won the feud and gained control of the family business.

Life in Java 
In the 1440s, Shi Da-jie left for Java and was made a shahbander (port master) of Gresik by the ruler of Majapahit from 1458 to 1483. She reportedly sent her ships to trade in Bali, the Moluccas and Cambodia.

She was known as Nyai Pinateh, also known as Njai Gede Pinatih.

In Gresik, she raised a child who would later become one of the Walisongo saints, Sunan Giri (Raden Paku).

Legacy 
She is honoured at her grave site as a promoter of Islam and the 'foster-mother' of Sunan Giri.

Books 
 Admiral Zheng He & Southeast Asia by Suryadinata Leo

References 

Chinese Muslims
People from Palembang
Indonesian people of Chinese descent
15th-century Indonesian women